The Living Soil (1943) by Lady Eve Balfour is considered a seminal classic in organic agriculture and the organic movement. The book is based on the initial findings of the first three years of the Haughley Experiment, the first formal, side-by-side farm trial to compare organic and chemical-based farming, started in 1939 by Balfour (with Alice Debenham), on two adjoining farms in Haughley Green, Suffolk, England.

The Living Soil was also published as The Living Soil and the Haughley Experiment.

References

External links
Soil And Health Library - full text repository for The Living Soil

1943 non-fiction books
1943 in the environment
Environmental non-fiction books
Organic farming
Faber and Faber books